Keith James O'Halloran (born 10 November 1975) is an Irish former professional footballer.

A right winger, O'Halloran began his career with Middlesbrough in 1994. He remained at Ayresome Park for three years, making just four league appearances.

After loan spells at Scunthorpe United and Cardiff City, he joined Scottish club St Johnstone, then managed by Paul Sturrock, for a £50,000 fee. In three years at McDiarmid Park, O'Halloran made 71 appearances, netting three goals along the way.

In 2000, he returned south of the border to join Swindon Town. He left Town in 2003 with 46 appearances and seven goals to his name. He then signed for Shamrock Rovers and in his two seasons scored 4 goals in 43 total appearances. He made his Rovers debut on 19 March.

References

External links 

1975 births
Living people
Republic of Ireland association footballers
Middlesbrough F.C. players
Scunthorpe United F.C. players
Cardiff City F.C. players
St Johnstone F.C. players
Swindon Town F.C. players
English Football League players
League of Ireland players
Shamrock Rovers F.C. players
Scottish Football League players
Scottish Premier League players
Premier League players
Association football midfielders